Second-seeded Margaret Smith defeated Lesley Turner 6–3, 3–6, 7–5 in the final to win the women's singles tennis title at the 1962 French Championships.

Seeds
The seeded players are listed below. Margaret Smith is the champion; others show the round in which they were eliminated.

  Ann Haydon (semifinals)
  Margaret Smith (champion)
  Christine Truman (fourth round)
  Zsuzsi Körmöczy (fourth round)
  Sandra Price (quarterfinals)
  Renée Schuurman (semifinals)
  Edda Buding (quarterfinals)
  Jan Lehane (quarterfinals)
  Liz Starkie (fourth round)
  Deidre Catt (third round)
  Justina Bricka (fourth round)
  Maria-Teresa Riedl (third round)
  Lesley Turner (finalist)
  Lea Pericoli (third round)
  Pilar Barril (second round)
  Jill Blackman (fourth round)

Draw

Key
 Q = Qualifier
 WC = Wild card
 LL = Lucky loser
 r = Retired

Finals

Earlier rounds

Section 1

Section 2

Section 3

Section 4

Section 5

Section 6

Section 7

Section 8

References

External links
   on the French Open website

1962
1962 in French women's sport
1962 in French tennis